Francis William Bain (29 April 1863 – 24 February 1940) was a British writer of fantasy stories that he claimed were translated from Sanskrit.

Biography
He was born on 29 April 1863, the son of Joseph Bain. He was educated at Westminster School, before going up to Christ Church, Oxford where he distinguished himself as a student of Classics. In 1889, he was elected a fellow of All Souls College.

In his youth he was a keen amateur footballer, representing the University against Cambridge between 1883 and 1886; he was also a member of the leading amateur teams of the time, Wanderers and Corinthians.

In 1892, he entered the Indian Educational Service, going on to become a professor of History in the Deccan College of Poonah (Pune), in British India, until his retirement in 1919. He died on 24 February 1940.

Writings
The first of these was A Digit of the Moon (1898), which Bain claimed was his translation of the eighth part of sixteen of a Sanskrit manuscript given to him by a brahmin. In the story, the king Súryakánta falls in love with the wise and beautiful princess Anangarágá, who will marry only the suitor who asks her a question she cannot answer. The king, with his clever friend Rasakósha, sets off to win the hand of the princess.

During Bain's life, the argument raged about whether the story was truly a translation or whether Bain had written it himself. While some early reviewers took his statements at face value, many did not. A contemporary review said, in part:

Though palpably a pretense, they are graceful fancies, and might as well have appeared for what they really are instead of masquerading as "translations". No Hindu, unless of this generation and under foreign influence, ever conceived these stories. . . . Moreover, they are of a strict propriety, whereas original Hindu love stories would put Rabelais's ghost to the blush.

The book contains numerous footnotes referring to Sanskrit puns and wordplay that the author claimed to have been unable to render in English.

A Digit of the Moon was followed by a number of other stories in the same mode: Syrup of the Bees, Bubbles of the Foam, Essence of the Dusk, Ashes of a God, Mine of Faults, Heifer of the Dawn, and others. As more books appeared, it became clearer that Bain was writing these stories himself, not translating. A review of Bubbles of the Foam in 1912 said:

 Yet, despite the beauty of the whole, there is much in the volume that seems non-Indian; in fact, distinctly Occidental. The phraseology lacks in great part the subtle Sanskrit flavor…

Significant portions of his book Descent of the Sun were used, often word-for-word and with credit, by Meatball Fulton for his Fourth Tower of Inverness radio series.

Before his fantasy series, he also wrote other works, including political works. One was "Antichrist: A Short Examination of the Spirit of the Age":

 It is difficult for a critic to do justice to a book which he finds irritating from cover to cover. Mr. Bain starts from the position that the French Revolution was "not necessary." […]

Bibliography

 A Digit of the Moon (1898)
 The Descent of the Sun [1903]
 A Heifer of the Dawn [1904]
 In the Great God's Hair [1905]
 A Draught of the Blue (1905)
 An Essence of the Dusk (1906)
 An Incarnation of the Snow (1908)
 A Mine of Faults (1909)
 The Ashes of a God (1910)
 Bubbles of the Foam (1912)
 A Syrup of the Bees (1914)
 The Livery of Eve (1917)
 The Substance of a Dream (1919)

See also

 False document technique

References

Further reading

External links
 
 
 The Indian Stories of F. W. Bain, at the Internet Sacred Texts Archive
 
 F. W. Bain at the Encyclopedia of Fantasy

1863 births
1940 deaths
People educated at Westminster School, London
Alumni of Christ Church, Oxford
Oxford University A.F.C. players
Wanderers F.C. players
Corinthian F.C. players
Fellows of All Souls College, Oxford
British fantasy writers
Association footballers not categorized by position
English footballers